Stationary phase may refer to 
 Stationary phase (biology), a phase in bacterial growth
 Stationary phase (chemistry), a medium used in chromatography
 Stationary phase approximation in the evaluation of integrals in mathematics